Aydoğan Vatandaş (born 1974) is an investigative journalist from Turkey, specializing in Political Science and International Relations. He is the author of 13 books, many of which have become bestsellers in Turkey. 'Reporting from the Bridge' and 'Hungry for Power: Erdogan's Witch Hunt and The Abuse of State Power' are the first two books published in English in the U.S.

He is the founder and the Editor-in-Chief of Politurco.com.

Life & work

While still in Turkey, he hosted a weekly TV discussion program titled "Black Box".

Books (in Turkish)
"Armageddon", 1996, (Timas): A focus on U.S foreign policy on the Middle East and Turkey which includes some Turkish classified documents over the changing objectives of the American Government in the region during the post-cold war era.  
ASALA Operations, 2005 (Alfa): an investigation into an Armenian militant group linked to the murders of Turkish diplomats between 1975 and 1984.
Secret of Barnabas, 2007 (Timaş, Fiction) Based on a true story, it tells about an early Aramaic gospel found in a tomb in the early 80's in Hakkâri, a city in southern Turkey.
Monşer, 2009 (Timaş) The story of a powerful Turkish family involved in the formation of the modern Turkish state.

Books (in English)
"Reporting From The Bridge" 2012 (Blue Dome Press) Selected Interviews conducted in the U.S particularly, on media and politics.
"Hungry for Power: Erdogan's Witch Hunt and Abuse of State Power" 2015 (Blue Dome Press)

References

http://www.huffingtonpost.com/author/aydoaean-vatanda

Turkish journalists
Living people
1974 births